Theatre in Kentucky

Theater venues in Kentucky include:

Ashland 

 Paramount Arts Center, a Kentucky landmark on the Historic Register, opened in 1931.

Bardstown 

 Stephen Foster - The Musical (formerly The Stephen Foster Story) at My Old Kentucky Home State Park

Bowling Green 

 Capitol Arts Center, vaudeville house in the late 1890s, a movie house in the mid-1930s, and today a thriving live performance theatre.

Danville 

 Pioneer Playhouse, the oldest outdoor theater in the state
 Norton Center for the Arts, Centre College

Falmouth 

 Kincaid Regional Theatre, Northern Kentucky's Only Professional Summer Theatre

Hopkinsville 

 Alhambra Theater, a community landmark

Horse Cave 

 Kentucky Repertory Theatre (formerly Horse Cave Theatre), also listed on the Historic Register

Lexington 

 The Kentucky Theater

Louisville 

 The Kentucky Center, the largest performing arts center in Kentucky, featuring touring plays and performances by the Kentucky Opera and the Louisville Ballet
 The Kentucky Shakespeare Festival, presenting free Shakespeare performances every summer in Louisville's Central Park.
 Actors Theatre of Louisville, which produces the Humana Festival of New American Plays, amongst many other productions
 The Louisville Palace
 CenterStage at the Jewish Community Center, Community Theatre which began in 1914, features Broadway-style musicals, professional children's theatre, and youth musical theatre training. 
 Iroquois Amphitheater, with shows produced by Broadway at Iroquois
 The Kentucky Theater

Murray 

 Playhouse in the Park

Paducah 

 The Market House

Prestonsburg 

 Jenny Wiley Theatre
 Mountain Arts Center

Pine Knob 

 The Pine Knob Theatre, presenting two plays from 1950s Daddy took the T-Bird Away/Lucy and Ruth's Diner and two from an earlier time period The Legend of Doc Brown and Down in Hoodoo Holler.  The plays run from June to September in Pine Knob Kentucky.

Somerset 

Flashback Theater Co. is a semi-professional theater company in Somerset, Kentucky with the mission of exploring our present relationship to the world through the lens of our past interactions as a community and through the passionate pursuit of theater that speaks to the soul.

See also 
 Performing arts in Louisville, Kentucky
 Theater in the United States

External links 

 Directory of historic theaters in Kentucky

Kentucky culture

Kentucky
Theaters